Edith's leaf-eared mouse (Graomys edithae) is a species of rodentin the family Cricetidae. 
It is known only from Argentina, where it was found in a montane grassland on Otro Cerro at an elevation of 3000 m.

References

Musser, G. G. and M. D. Carleton. 2005. Superfamily Muroidea. pp. 894–1531 in Mammal Species of the World a Taxonomic and Geographic Reference. D. E. Wilson and D. M. Reeder eds. Johns Hopkins University Press, Baltimore.

Graomys
Mammals of Argentina
Mammals described in 1919
Taxa named by Oldfield Thomas
Taxonomy articles created by Polbot